Postplatyptilia flinti is a moth of the family Pterophoridae. It is known from Argentina, Brazil and Paraguay.

The wingspan is about 15 mm. Adults are on wing in December.

References

flinti
Moths described in 1991